Lyubov Kobzova (born 3 June 1957) is a Russian former swimmer. She competed in three events at the 1976 Summer Olympics representing the Soviet Union.

References

1957 births
Living people
Russian female swimmers
Olympic swimmers of the Soviet Union
Swimmers at the 1976 Summer Olympics
Swimmers from Moscow
Soviet female swimmers